Freasley is a small village  in Warwickshire, England. It has a church and a Grade II listed Hall.

References

External links

Villages in Warwickshire